Tori Franklin (born October 7, 1992) is an American triple jumper. Tori Franklin is the first American woman to ever medal in the triple jump at a World Athletics Championships (which happened in 2022). Tori Franklin also notably competed in the  women's triple jump at the 2019 and 2017 World Championships in Athletics, jumping a personal best  in the preliminary round to place 9th & 13th respectively.

Competition
Tori Franklin competed at the 2014 North America Central American and Caribbean Under-23 Championships in Kamloops, British Columbia. There Franklin competed for the United States in the triple jump and posted a mark of 13.42 meters to finish first overall in the event.

Franklin competed in the women's triple jump at the 2017 World Championships in Athletics, jumping a then personal best  in the preliminary round to rank #13 as the best non-qualifying athlete.

Franklin qualified for the final with her  first round jump at the 2018 World Indoor Championships, to eventually place 8th.

Franklin broke the U.S. record in the triple jump with her  performance at the International Meeting Region de Guadeloupe in Baie-Mahault, Guadeloupe, France (overseas region) on May 12, 2018 - surpassing Olympic 4th-place finisher Keturah Orji‘s .

In 2021, Franklin moved to Athens, Greece.

Franklin won a bronze medal at the 2022 World Athletics Championships in Eugene, Oregon; on her fifth jump she moved from 4th to 3rd place with her best jump of the season. Her medal was the United States' first ever World Championship Triple Jump medal.

US Track and field Championships

Michigan State University
Tori Franklin broke the Michigan State University Spartans school record in the triple jump for the first time  en route to a first-place finish at the University of Notre Dame Meyo Invitational to earn February 2014 Big Ten Conference athlete of the week for Women's Indoor Track and Field.

Tori Franklin set Michigan State University Spartans school records in the triple jump  indoor and  outdoor.

Prep
As a senior in 2011, Tori anchored a 4x400 meters at Illinois High School Association AAA state track and field final to a silver medal.

References

External links

 

World Ranking Women Triple Jump
Tori FRANKLIN All-Athletics profile

1992 births
Living people
American female triple jumpers
Track and field athletes from Chicago
World Athletics Championships athletes for the United States
World Athletics Championships medalists
People from Westmont, Illinois
Michigan State Spartans women's track and field athletes
USA Indoor Track and Field Championships winners
Athletes (track and field) at the 2020 Summer Olympics
Olympic track and field athletes of the United States